The Battle of Las Navas de Tolosa, known in Islamic history as the Battle of Al-Uqab, took place on 16 July 1212 and was an important turning point in the Reconquista and the medieval history of Spain. The Christian forces of King Alfonso VIII of Castile were joined by the armies of his rivals, Sancho VII of Navarre and Peter II of Aragon, in battle against the Almohad Muslim rulers of the southern half of the Iberian Peninsula. The caliph al-Nasir (Miramamolín in the Spanish chronicles) led the Almohad army, made up of people from all over the Almohad Caliphate.

Background

In 1195, the Almohads defeated Alfonso VIII of Castile in the Battle of Alarcos. After this victory, they took several important cities: Trujillo, Plasencia, Talavera, Cuenca, and Uclés. Then, in 1211, Muhammad al-Nasir crossed the Strait of Gibraltar with a powerful army, invaded Christian territory, and captured Salvatierra Castle, the stronghold of the knights of the Order of Calatrava. The threat to the Hispanic Christian kingdoms was so great that Pope Innocent III called Christian knights to a crusade.

Previous movements 
There were some disagreements among the members of the Christian coalition; notably, French and other European knights did not agree with Alfonso's merciful treatment of Jews and Muslims who had been defeated in the conquest of Malagón and Calatrava la Vieja. Previously, they had caused problems in Toledo (where the different armies of the Crusade gathered), with assaults and murders in the Jewish Quarter.

Battle
Alfonso crossed the mountain range that defended the Almohad camp, sneaking through the Despeñaperros Pass, led by Martín Alhaja, a local shepherd who knew the area. The Christian coalition caught the encamped Moorish army by surprise, and Alhaja was granted the hereditary title Cabeza de Vaca for his assistance to Alfonso VIII.

The battle was fought at relatively close range, so that neither the Almohads nor the Spaniards could use archers in the melee-dominated fight. Spanish knights became locked in close-quarter combat, in which they were superior to the Almohads.

Some of the Spanish knights, namely the Order of Santiago, eventually broke the Almohad line of defense decisively as they inflicted heavy casualties on the Almohads and established a breakthrough with gaps appearing in the enemy lines. This led to a possible spearhead. King Sancho VII then led his mounted knights through the gaps, exploiting them, and charged at the Caliph's tent.

According to legend, the Caliph had surrounded his tent with a bodyguard of slave-warriors. Though it was once claimed that these men were chained together to prevent flight, it is considered more likely that this results from a mistranslation of the word "serried", meaning a densely packed formation. The Navarrese force led by their king Sancho VII broke through this bodyguard. The Caliph escaped, but the Moors were routed, leaving heavy casualties on the battlefield. The victorious Christians seized several prizes of war; Muhammad al-Nasir's tent and standard were delivered to Pope Innocent III.

Christian losses were far fewer, only about 2,000 men (though not so few as legend had it). The losses were particularly notable among the Orders: those killed included Pedro Gómez de Acevedo (bannerman of the Order of Calatrava), Alvaro Fernández de Valladares (comendator of the Order of Santiago), Pedro Arias (master of the Order of Santiago, died of wounds on 3 August), and Gomes Ramires (Portuguese master of the Knights Templar and simultaneously master of Leon, Castile, and Portugal); Ruy Díaz (master of the Order of Calatrava) was so grievously wounded that he had to resign his command.

Muhammad al-Nasir died in Marrakech shortly afterwards.

Aftermath
The crushing defeat of the Almohads significantly hastened their decline both in the Iberian Peninsula and in the Maghreb a decade later. That gave further impulse to the Christian Reconquest and sharply reduced the already declining power of the Moors in Iberia. Shortly after the battle, the Castilians took Baeza and then Úbeda, major fortified cities near the battlefield and gateways to invade Andalusia. According to a letter from Alfonso VIII of Castile to Pope Innocent III, Baeza was evacuated and its people moved to Úbeda; Alfonso laid siege, killing 60,000 Muslims and enslaving many more. According to the Latin Chronicle of Kings of Castile the number given is almost 100,000 Saracens, including children and women, who were captured.

Thereafter, Alfonso VIII's grandson Ferdinand III of Castile took Córdoba in 1236, Jaén in 1246, and Seville in 1248; then he took Arcos, Medina-Sidonia, Jerez, and Cádiz. In 1252, Ferdinand was preparing his fleet and army for invasion of the Almohad lands in Africa. But he died in Seville on 30 May 1252, during an outbreak of plague in southern Hispania.
Only Ferdinand's death prevented the Castilians from taking the war to the Almohad on the Mediterranean coast, James I of Aragon conquered the Balearic Islands (from 1228 over the following four years) and Valencia (the city capitulated on 28 September 1238).

By 1252 the Almohad empire was almost finished, at the mercy of another emerging Berber power. In 1269 a new association of Berber tribes, the Marinids, took control of Morocco. Later, the Marinids tried to recover the former Almohad territories in Iberia, but they were definitively defeated by Alfonso XI of Castile and Afonso IV of Portugal in the Battle of Río Salado, the last major military encounter between large Christian and Muslim armies in Hispania. So, the  battle of Las Navas de Tolosa seems to have been a true turning point in the history of the region, including the western Mediterranean sea.

Moorish Granada
In 1292 Sancho IV took Tarifa, key to the control of the Strait of Gibraltar. Granada, Almería, and Málaga were the only major Muslim cities remaining in the Iberian peninsula. These three cities were the core of the Emirate of Granada, ruled by the Nasrid dynasty. Granada was a vassal state of Castile, until finally taken by the Catholic Monarchs in 1492.

In fiction
Harry Harrison's 1972 alternate history/science fiction novel Tunnel Through the Deeps depicts a history where the Moors won at Las Navas de Tolosa and retained part of Spain into the 20th century.

Notes

References
 Alvira Cabrer, Martín, Las Navas de Tolosa, 1212: idea, liturgia y memoria de la batalla, Sílex Ediciones, Madrid 2012 (Spanish).
 García Fitz, Francisco, Las Navas de Tolosa, Ariel, Barcelona 2005 (Spanish).
 García Fitz, Francisco, Was Las Navas a decisive battle?, in: Journal of Medieval Iberian Studies (JMIS), vol. 4, no. 1, 5–9.
 Nafziger, George F. and Mark W. Walton, Islam at War: a history, Greenwood Publishing Company, 2003.
 O’Callaghan, Joseph F., Reconquest and crusade in medieval Spain, University of Pennsylvania Press, Philadelphia PA 2004.
 Setton, Kenneth Meyer, A History of the Crusades, University of Wisconsin Press, 1975.
 Vara Thorbeck, Carlos, El lunes de las Navas, Universidad de Jaén, 1999. Re-edited with another title: Las Navas de Tolosa: 1212, la batalla que decidió la Reconquista, Edhasa, Barcelona 2012 (Spanish).
 Xenealoxía.org - Genealogía de Galicia - Valladares, Marquesado de.
Gomez, Miguel Dolan, "The Battle of Las Navas de Tolosa: The Culture and Practice of Crusading in Medieval Iberia. " PhD diss., University of Tennessee, 2011.
 La Casa de Valladares, del siglo XVII, está en riesgo de desaparición.
 [Prof. Nick, National Museum of Las Navas de Tolosa, Spain. (2015). Battle of Las Navas de Tolosa Museum, Andalusia. https://www.visit-andalucia.com/battle-of-navas-tolosa-museum-jaen]

Further reading

 
  Martín Alvira-Cabrer, Las Navas de Tolosa, 1212. Idea, liturgia y memoria de la batalla, Sílex, Madrid, 2012. 

1212 in Europe
Las Navas de Tolosa
Las Navas de Tolosa 1212
Las Navas de Tolosa 1212
Las Navas de Tolosa 1212
Las Navas de Tolosa 1212
Las Navas de Tolosa 1212
Las Navas de Tolosa
Military history of Spain
13th-century crusades
Conflicts in 1212
Navas de Tolosa
13th century in Al-Andalus
13th century in Aragon
13th century in Castile
13th century in Portugal